Hibiscus paramutabilis, the everblooming Confederate rose, is a species of flowering plant in the family Malvaceae, native to southeastern China.

Subtaxa
The following varieties are accepted, based solely on the lengths of their pedicels:
Hibiscus paramutabilis var. longipedicellatus  – Jinxiu
Hibiscus paramutabilis var. paramutabilis – Guangxi, Hunan, Jiangxi

References

paramutabilis
Endemic flora of China
Flora of Southeast China
Plants described in 1922